The Army of Kentucky was the name of two Union army formations.  Both were small and short-lived, serving in Kentucky in 1862 and 1863.

Army of August 1862
On August 25, 1862 Major General William "Bull" Nelson assumed command of the forces stationed around Richmond, Kentucky.  Although the whole force was no more than two brigades, Nelson dubbed the force "Army of Kentucky". The two brigades were commanded by brigadier generals Mahlon D. Manson and Charles Cruft respectively. Merely five days after its creation, the army of mostly green soldiers went into action at the Battle of Richmond and was soundly defeated. The army lost over 800 killed and 4,000 prisoners. Because of the large number of prisoners (including Manson) and the wounding of Nelson, the Army of Kentucky virtually ceased to exist. Cruft officially remained in command of the 2nd Brigade until September but the majority of his brigade had been captured while the rest simply marched back to New Albany, Indiana. Captain Charles C. Gilbert was appointed acting major general and placed in command of the remnants of the Army.  In September 1862 General Don Carlos Buell absorbed the remnants into the III Corps of the Army of the Ohio.

Army of October 1862
On October 7, 1862 Major General Gordon Granger revived the name "Army of Kentucky".  It was originally composed of three divisions commanded respectively by generals Andrew J. Smith, Quincy A. Gilmore, and Absalom Baird.

This form of the army was unusual in the fact that on January 20, it was attached to the larger Army of the Cumberland.  Baird's division fought at the Battle of Thompson's Station in March 1863 and nearly one entire brigade was captured there.  In April, 1863 the army was composed of two divisions of infantry under Charles C. Gilbert and Absalom Baird with a brigade of cavalry under Green Clay Smith.  A division of cavalry under David S. Stanley was attached as well as the garrison of Franklin, TN.  In this formation the army fought at the Battle of the Harpeth River (or First Franklin) on April 10.  On June 8, 1863 the Army of Kentucky essentially became the Reserve Corps of the Army of the Cumberland still under the command of Granger.

Commanders
William "Bull" Nelson (August 25–30, 1862)
Charles C. Gilbert (September 1–27, 1862)
Gordon Granger (October 7, 1862-8 June 1863)

Major battles
Battle of Richmond (Nelson)
First Battle of Franklin (Granger)

See also
Richmond Union order of battle
Franklin (1863) order of battle

References

Eicher, John H., and Eicher, David J., Civil War High Commands, Stanford University Press, 2001, .

Kentucky, Army of
Kentucky in the American Civil War
1862 establishments in Kentucky
Military units and formations established in 1862
Military units and formations disestablished in 1863